The men's 10 metre running target event at the 2018 Asian Games in Jakarta, Indonesia took place on 23–24 August at the Jakabaring International Shooting Range.

Schedule
All times are Western Indonesia Time (UTC+07:00)

Records

Results

Qualification

Knockout round

Semifinals

Bronze medal match

Gold medal match

References

External links
Official website
 Results at asia-shooting.org

Men's 10 metre running target